Presidential elections were held in Liberia in 1851. The result was a victory for incumbent President Joseph Jenkins Roberts.

References

Liberia
1851 in Liberia
Elections in Liberia
May 1851 events
Election and referendum articles with incomplete results